Shahjahan Mia is a Bangladesh Awami League politician. He is the current Jatiya Sangsad member from Patuakhali-1 constituency. He served as the State Minister of Religious Affairs in the second Sheikh Hasina administration. He served as President of Patuakhali Zilla Awami League until December, 2019.

References

1940 births
Living people
Awami League politicians
State Ministers of Religious Affairs (Bangladesh)
11th Jatiya Sangsad members
Place of birth missing (living people)
9th Jatiya Sangsad members
7th Jatiya Sangsad members